A partial lunar eclipse took place on Thursday, March 13, 1941. The Earth's shadow on the moon was clearly visible in this eclipse, with 32% of the Moon in shadow; the partial eclipse lasted for 1 hour exactly.

Visibility

Related lunar eclipses

Saros series

Half-Saros cycle
A lunar eclipse will be preceded and followed by solar eclipses by 9 years and 5.5 days (a half saros). This lunar eclipse is related to two annular solar eclipses of Solar Saros 119.

See also 
List of lunar eclipses and List of 21st-century lunar eclipses

References

External links 
 Saros series 112
 

1941-03
1941 in science